Kairat Akhmetov (Kazakh: Қайрат Ахметов; born October 12, 1987)  is a Kazakhstani mixed martial artist. He currently fights as a flyweight for ONE Championship and is a former ONE Flyweight Champion. He is currently ranked #2 in the ONE Championship Flyweight rankings.

Background
Kairat “The Kazakh” Akhmetov was inspired by his father, an amateur champion in Greco-Roman wrestling, and soon followed in his footsteps. Akhmetov started training in 2000, and proved to be as talented as his father, eventually becoming a three-time National Greco-Roman Champion in Kazakhstan. He also took to taekwondo, winning a regional championship.

Mixed martial arts career

Early career
After turning professional in 2010, Akhmetov racked a 19–0 record almost solely in his native Kazakhstani regional circuit before being signed to the ONE Championship in 2015.

ONE Championship
During his ONE Championship debut at ONE Championship: Dynasty of Champions (Beijing II) Akhmetov won the ONE Flyweight Championship from Adriano Moraes by split decision. During the bout, Akhmetov suffered a back injury, leaving him unable to compete for nearly two years.  During Akhmetov's absence, Moraes would capture the Interim ONE Flyweight Championship. The two would meet again at ONE Championship: Kings & Conquerors for the unification bout. Akhmetov lost via unanimous decision. 

At ONE Championship: Global Superheroes Akhmetov lost to Geje Eustaquio by unanimous decision in a bout for the Interim ONE Flyweight Championship. 

Akhmetov faced Danny Kingad at ONE: Winter Warriors II on December 17, 2021. He won the bout via unanimous decision.

Akhmetov faced Tatsumitsu Wada at ONE 158 on June 3, 2022. Akhmetov won the bout via unanimous decision.

Akhmetov is scheduled to face Reece McLaren on May 5, 2023, at ONE Fight Night 10.

Championships and accomplishments  
 ONE Championship 
 ONE Flyweight Championship (One time)

Mixed martial arts record 

|-
| Win
| align=center| 29–2
| Tatsumitsu Wada
| Decision (unanimous)
| ONE 158
| 
| align=center| 3
| align=center| 5:00
| Kallang, Singapore
| 
|-
| Win
| align=center| 28–2
| Danny Kingad
| Decision (unanimous)
| ONE: Winter Warriors II
| 
| align=center| 3
| align=center| 5:00
| Kallang, Singapore
| 
|-
| Win
| align=center| 27–2
| Dae Hwan Kim
| Decision (unanimous)
| ONE: Collision Course 2
| 
| align=center| 3
| align=center| 5:00
| Kallang, Singapore
| 
|-
| Win
| align=center| 26–2
| Reece McLaren
| Decision (unanimous)
| ONE: A New Era
| 
| align=center| 3
| align=center| 5:00
| Tokyo, Japan
| 
|-
| Win
| align=center| 25–2
| Haobin Ma
| Decision (unanimous)
| ONE: Conquest of Heroes
| 
| align=center| 3
| align=center| 5:00
| Jakarta, Indonesia
| 
|-
| Loss
| align=center| 24–2
| Geje Eustaquio
| Decision (unanimous)
| ONE: Global Superheroes
| 
| align=center| 5
| align=center| 5:00
| Manila, Philippines
| 
|-
| Win
| align=center| 24–1
| Geje Eustaquio
| Decision (split)
| ONE: Total Victory
| 
| align=center| 5
| align=center| 5:00
| Jakarta, Indonesia
| 
|-
| Loss
| align=center| 23–1
| Adriano Moraes
| Decision (unanimous)
| ONE: Kings & Conquerors
| 
| align=center| 5
| align=center| 5:00
| Macau, SAR, China
| 
|-
| Win
| align=center| 23–0
| Adriano Moraes
| Decision (split)
| ONE: Dynasty of Champions (Beijing II)
| 
| align=center| 5
| align=center| 5:00
| Beijing, China
| 
|-
| Win
| align=center| 22–0
| Artemij Sitenkov
| TKO (corner stoppage)
| Alash Pride: Golden Horde
| 
| align=center| 1
| align=center| 3:01
| Almaty, Kazakhstan
| 
|-
| Win
| align=center| 21–0
| Salah Elkas
| Decision (unanimous)
| Alash Pride: Warriors of the Steppe
| 
| align=center| 2
| align=center| 5:00
| Almaty, Kazakhstan
| 
|-
| Win
| align=center| 20–0
| Tatsuya Watanabe
| Decision (unanimous)
| Alash Pride: Great Battle 2
| 
| align=center| 3
| align=center| 5:00
| Almaty, Kazakhstan
| 
|-
| Win
| align=center| 19–0
| Jae Nam Yoo
| Decision (unanimous)
| AP: Grand Prix 2013
| 
| align=center| 2
| align=center| 5:00
| Almaty, Kazakhstan
| 
|-
| Win
| align=center| 18–0
| Nurali Bakirdinova
| Submission (choke)
| Alash Pride: Great Battle
| 
| align=center| 1
| align=center| 3:05
| Almaty, Kazakhstan
| 
|-
| Win
| align=center| 17–0
| Zhuo Yang
| Submission (rear-naked choke)
| AP: Alash Pride 2
| 
| align=center| 1
| align=center| 1:30
| Almaty, Kazakhstan
|
|-
| Win
| align=center| 16–0
| Rafaels Saldes
| Submission (armbar)
| Bushido Luihuania: Vol. 53
| 
| align=center| 1
| align=center| 4:12
| London, England
|
|-
| Win
| align=center| 15–0
| Kaan Kazgan
| Submission (rear-naked choke)
| Bushido Luihuania: Vol. 53
| 
| align=center| 2
| align=center| 2:41
| Astana, Kazakhstan
|
|-
| Win
| align=center| 14–0
| Vladislav Nikitchenko
| Decision (unanimous)
| AP: Nowruz Cup 2012
| 
| align=center| 3
| align=center| 5:00
| Almaty, Kazakhstan
|
|-
| Win
| align=center| 13–0
| Ruslan Belikov
| KO (punch)
| Bushido Luihuania: Vol. 50
| 
| align=center| 1
| align=center| 0:49
| Almaty, Kazakhstan
|
|-
| Win
| align=center| 12–0
| Farkhad Firuzi
| Submission (rear-naked choke)
| AP: Cardinal Cup 2011
| 
| align=center| 1
| align=center| 3:48
| Almaty, Kazakhstan
|
|-
| Win
| align=center| 11–0
| Nurlan Kamagulov
| Submission (rear-naked choke)
|rowspan=3 | Zhekpe Zhek Cup 2011
|rowspan=3 | 
| align=center| 1
|align=center| 3:01
|rowspan=3 | Kaskelen, Kazakhstan
|
|-
| Win
| align=center| 10–0
| Aziz Baginbaev
| Submission (armbar) 
| align=center| 1
| align=center| 4:23
|
|-
| Win
| align=center| 9–0
| Janibek Omaruly
| Submission (guillotine choke)
| align=center| 1
| align=center| 1:23
|
|-
| Win
| align=center| 8–0
| Abdyrashid Zholdasbayev
| Submission (rear-naked choke)
| Riviera Grand Prix 2011
| 
| align=center| 1
| align=center| 1:30
| Kapchagai, Kazakhstan
|
|-
| Win
| align=center| 7–0
| Djamadyn Zaribzhanov
| TKO (punches)
| Riviera Grand Prix 2011
| 
| align=center| 1
| align=center| 1:04
| Kapchagai, Kazakhstan
|
|-
| Win
| align=center| 6–0
| Janibek Omaruly
| Submission (Achilles lock)
| Iron Horde: Kazakhstan vs. Kyrgyzstan
| 
| align=center| 1
| align=center| 2:21
| Almaty, Kazakhstan
|
|-
| Win
| align=center| 5–0
| Amanjol Kunanyshbaev
| TKO (punches)
| Sarbaz Cup 2011: Kazakhstan vs. Uzbekistan
| 
| align=center| 1
| align=center| 3:18
| Almaty, Kazakhstan
|
|-
| Win
| align=center| 4–0
| Tofik Mamedov
| TKO (punches)
| S-1: Selection 2011
| 
| align=center| 1
| align=center| 4:20
| Almaty, Kazakhstan
|
|-
| Win
| align=center| 3–0
| Zirodin Abdulkerimov
| Submission (rear-naked choke)
| Alash Pride 1
| 
| align=center| 1
| align=center| 2:54
| Almaty, Kazakhstan
|
|-
| Win
| align=center| 2–0
| Nurazy Balayev
| Submission (standing guillotine choke)
| Iron Horde Cup 2
| 
| align=center| 1
| align=center| 2:38
| Almaty, Kazakhstan
|
|-
| Win
| align=center| 1–0
| Anatoly Akhmetov
| Submission (rear-naked choke)
| Iron Horde Cup
| 
| align=center| 1
| align=center| 0:48
| Almaty, Kazakhstan
|

See also
List of male mixed martial artists
List of ONE Flyweight Champions
List of current ONE Flyweight fighters

References

External links
 Kairat Akhmetov at ONE
 

1987 births
Living people
Kazakhstani male mixed martial artists
Flyweight mixed martial artists
Mixed martial artists utilizing Greco-Roman wrestling
Mixed martial artists utilizing taekwondo
Kazakhstani male taekwondo practitioners
Kazakhstani male sport wrestlers
People from Taldykorgan
ONE Championship champions